Syarhey Chernik (born 20 July 1988) is a Belarusian professional footballer who plays for Shakhtyor Soligorsk.

Career
Born in Grodno, Chernik began playing football in FC Neman Grodno's youth system. He joined the senior team and made his Belarusian Premier League debut in 2010. Chernik currently holds the Belarusian Premier League record for the number of consecutive minutes without conceding a goal (1073), which he set in June 2015.

Chernik made his debut for the Belarus national football team on 15 November 2013, in a match against Albania.

Honours
BATE Borisov
Belarusian Premier League champion: 2014, 2015, 2016
Belarusian Cup winner: 2014–15, 2019–20
Belarusian Super Cup winner: 2015, 2016

Shakhtyor Soligorsk
Belarusian Premier League champion: 2021, 2022
Belarusian Super Cup winner: 2021, 2023

References

External links
 
 

1988 births
Living people
Sportspeople from Grodno
Belarusian footballers
Association football goalkeepers
Belarus international footballers
Belarusian expatriate footballers
Expatriate footballers in France
Expatriate footballers in Kazakhstan
Belarusian Premier League players
Ligue 1 players
Ligue 2 players
FC Neman Grodno players
FC BATE Borisov players
AS Nancy Lorraine players
FC Irtysh Pavlodar players
FC Gorodeya players
FC Shakhtyor Soligorsk players